The 2015 Big Ten softball tournament was held at Buckeye Field on the campus of Ohio State University in Columbus, Ohio from May 7 through May 9, 2015. As the tournament winner, Michigan earned the Big Ten Conference's automatic bid to the 2015 NCAA Division I softball tournament. All but the first two games of the tournament aired on BTN. The first two games were streamed online on BTN+.

Tournament

All times listed are Eastern Daylight Time.

Only the top 12 participate in the tournament, therefore Wisconsin and Michigan State were not eligible to play.

Announcers
Thursday
 Matt McGreevy & Ryan Reese
Friday
 Lisa Byington & Carol Bruggeman (Early)
 Andy Masur & Jennie Ritter (Late)
Saturday
 Lisa Byington & Carol Bruggeman

Notes 

 Ohio State's 24 runs is a tournament record

References

2015 Big Ten Conference softball season
Big Ten Tournament
Big Ten softball tournament